Robert Clark Seger (born May 6, 1945) is an American singer, songwriter, and musician. As a locally successful Detroit-area artist, he performed and recorded as Bob Seger and the Last Heard and The Bob Seger System throughout the 1960s, breaking through with his first album, Ramblin' Gamblin' Man (which contained his first national hit of the same name) in 1968. By the early 1970s, he had dropped the 'System' from his recordings and continued to strive for broader success with various other bands. In 1973, he put together the Silver Bullet Band, with a group of Detroit-area musicians, with whom he became most successful on the national level with the album Live Bullet (1976), recorded live with the Silver Bullet Band in 1975 at Cobo Hall in Detroit, Michigan. In 1976, he achieved a national breakout with the studio album Night Moves. On his studio albums, he also worked extensively with the Alabama-based Muscle Shoals Rhythm Section, which appeared on several of Seger's best-selling singles and albums.

A roots rocker with a classic raspy, powerful voice, Seger wrote and recorded songs that dealt with love, women, and blue-collar themes, and is one of the best-known examples of a heartland rock artist. He has recorded many hits, including "Night Moves", "Turn the Page", "Mainstreet", "Still the Same", "Hollywood Nights", "Against the Wind", "You'll Accomp'ny Me", "Shame on the Moon", "Roll Me Away", "Like a Rock", and "Shakedown", the last of which was written for the 1987 film Beverly Hills Cop II and topped the Billboard Hot 100 chart. He also co-wrote the Eagles' number-one hit "Heartache Tonight", and his recording of "Old Time Rock and Roll" was named one of the Songs of the Century in 2001.

With a career spanning six decades, Seger has sold more than 75 million records worldwide, making him one of the world's best-selling artists of all time. Seger was inducted into the Rock and Roll Hall of Fame in 2004 and the Songwriters Hall of Fame in 2012. Seger was named Billboard 2015 Legend of Live honoree at the 12th annual Billboard Touring Conference & Awards, held November 18–19 at the Roosevelt Hotel in New York. He announced his farewell tour in September 2018.

Early years 
Seger was born at Henry Ford Hospital in Detroit, Michigan, the son of Charlotte and Stewart Seger. At age five, he moved with his family to Ann Arbor. He had an older brother, George.

Seger's father, a medical technician for the Ford Motor Company, played several instruments and Seger was exposed to music from an early age. Seger was also exposed to frequent arguments between his parents that disturbed the neighborhood at night. In 1956, when Seger was 10 years old, his father abandoned the family and moved to California. The remaining family soon lost their comfortable middle-class status and struggled financially.

Seger attended Tappan Junior High School (now Tappan Middle School) in Ann Arbor, Michigan, and graduated in 1963 from Pioneer High School, known at the time as Ann Arbor High School. He ran track and field in high school. Seger also went to Lincoln Park High School for a time.

Regarding his early musical inspirations, Seger has stated, "Little Richard – he was the first one that really got to me. Little Richard and, of course, Elvis Presley." "Come Go with Me" by The Del-Vikings, a hit in 1957, was the first record he bought.

Regional favorite and first national hit: 1961–1976

The Decibels and The Town Criers 
Bob Seger arrived on the Detroit music scene in 1961 fronting a three-piece band called the Decibels. The band included Seger on guitar, piano, keyboards, and vocals, Pete Stanger on guitar, and R.B. Hunter on drums. All of the members attended Ann Arbor High. The Decibels recorded an acetate demo of a song called "The Lonely One", at Del Shannon's studio in 1961. As well as being Seger's first original song, "The Lonely One" was Seger's first song to be played on the radio, airing only once on an Ann Arbor radio station.  In 2021, a recording of "The Lonely One" resurfaced, and was broadcast (with permission from Seger) twice on WCSX-FM in Detroit, on the mornings of March 15 and 16.

After the Decibels disbanded, Seger joined the Town Criers, a four-piece band with Seger on lead vocals, John Flis on bass, Pep Perrine on drums, and Larry Mason on lead guitar. The Town Criers, covering songs like "Louie Louie", began gaining a steady following. Meanwhile, Seger was listening to James Brown and said that, for him and his friends, Live at the Apollo was their favorite record following its release in 1963. Seger was also widely influenced by the music of The Beatles, once they hit American shores in 1964. In general, he and local musician friends such as Glenn Frey (later a member of the Eagles) bought into the premises of 1960s pop and rock radio, with its hook-driven hits; he later recalled himself and Frey thinking at the time, "You're nobody if you can't get on the radio."

Doug Brown & The Omens 
As the Town Criers began landing more gigs, Bob Seger met a man named Doug Brown, backed by a band called The Omens. Seger joined Doug Brown & The Omens, who presumably had a bigger following than the Town Criers. While Doug Brown was the primary lead vocalist for the group, Seger would take the lead on some songs—covering R&B numbers. It was with this group that Seger first appeared on an officially released recording: the 1965 single "TGIF" backed with "First Girl", credited to Doug Brown and The Omens. Seger later appeared on Doug Brown and The Omens' parody of Barry Sadler's song "Ballad of the Green Berets" which was re-titled "Ballad of the Yellow Beret" and mocked draft evaders. Soon after its release, Sadler and his record label threatened Brown and his band with a lawsuit, and the recording was withdrawn from the market.

While Bob was a member of The Omens, he met his longtime manager Edward "Punch" Andrews, who at the time was partnered with Dave Leone running the Hideout franchise, which consisted of four club locations from Clawson to Rochester Hills, where local acts would play, and a small-scale record label. Seger began writing and producing for other acts that Punch was managing, such as the Mama Cats and the Mushrooms (with Frey). Seger and Doug Brown were then approached by Punch and Leone to write a song for the Underdogs, another local band who recently had a hit with a song called "Man in the Glass". Seger contributed a song called "East Side Story", which ultimately proved to be a failure for the Underdogs.

The Last Heard 
Seger decided to record "East Side Story" himself, and officially left the Omens (though he did retain Doug Brown as a producer). As Bob Seger and the Last Heard, Seger released his version of the song with Hideout Records in January 1966, and it became his first big Detroit hit. The single (backed with "East Side Sound", an instrumental version of "East Side Story") sold 50,000 copies, mostly in the Detroit area, and led to a contract with Cameo-Parkway Records. Though the name "The Last Heard" originally referred to the collection of Omens and Town Criers who recorded "East Side Story" with Seger, it soon became the name of Seger's permanent band, which consisted of former Town Crier Pep Perrine on drums, Carl Lagassa on guitar, and Dan Honaker on bass. Following "East Side Story", the group released four more singles: the James Brown-inspired holiday single "Sock It to Me Santa", the Dylan-esque "Persecution Smith", "Vagrant Winter", and perhaps the most notable, "Heavy Music", released in 1967. "Heavy Music", which sold even more copies than "East Side Story", had the potential to break out nationally when Cameo-Parkway suddenly went out of business. The song would stay in Seger's live act for many years to come.

The Bob Seger System 
After Cameo-Parkway folded, Seger and Punch began searching for a new label. In the spring of 1968, Bob Seger & the Last Heard signed with major label Capitol Records, turning down Motown Records, who offered more money than Capitol. Seger felt that Capitol was more appropriate for his genre than Motown.

Capitol changed the name of the band to The Bob Seger System. In the transition between labels, guitarist Carl Lagassa left the band and keyboard player Bob Schultz joined. The System's first single with Capitol was the anti-war message song "2 + 2 = ?", which reflected a marked change in Seger's political attitudes from "The Ballad of the Yellow Beret". The single was again a hit in Detroit and hit number 1 on radio stations in Buffalo, New York and Orlando, Florida, but went unnoticed almost everywhere else, and failed to chart nationally in the US.

The second single from The Bob Seger System was "Ramblin' Gamblin' Man". The song's success led to the release of an album of the same title in 1969. The Ramblin' Gamblin' Man album reached  on the Billboard pop albums chart. Glenn Frey had his first studio gig singing back-up and playing guitar on "Ramblin' Gamblin' Man".

Seger was unable to follow up on this success. For the next album, singer-songwriter Tom Neme joined The System, ultimately writing and singing the majority of the tunes featured, for which the group was heavily criticized. The album called Noah (1969), failed to chart at all, leading Seger to briefly quit the music industry and attend college. He returned the following year and put out the System's final album, 1970's Mongrel, this time without Neme. Bob Schultz left the band as well, being replaced by Dan Watson. Mongrel, with the powerful single "Lucifer", was considered to be a strong album by many critics and Detroit fans, but failed to do well commercially.

The Bob Seger System was inducted into the Michigan Rock and Roll Legends Hall of Fame in 2006.

Solo 
After Mongrel (1970) failed to live up to the success of Ramblin' Gamblin' Man (1969), The System dissipated. For a short period following the breakup, Seger had ambitions to be a one-man act. In 1971, he released his first solo album, the all-acoustic Brand New Morning. The album was a commercial failure, and led to his departure from Capitol Records.

Seger, having regained an eye for bands, began playing with the duo Teegarden & Van Winkle, who in 1970 had a hit single with "God, Love and Rock & Roll". Together they recorded Smokin' O.P.'s (1972), released on Punch Andrews' own Palladium Records. The album mainly consisted of covers, spawning a minor hit with a version of Tim Hardin's "If I Were a Carpenter" ( the US), though it did feature "Someday", a new Seger original, and a re-release of "Heavy Music". The album reached 180 on the Billboard 200.

After spending most of 1972 touring with Teegarden & Van Winkle, Seger left the duo to put together a new backing band, referred to as both My Band and the Borneo Band, made up of musicians from Tulsa, Oklahoma. Jamie Oldaker, Dick Sims, and Marcy Levy were all members of My Band before joining Eric Clapton's backing band. In 1973, Seger put out Back in '72, recorded partly with the Muscle Shoals Rhythm Section, a renowned group of session musicians who had recorded with the likes of J. J. Cale and Aretha Franklin. According to Seger, there was a financial misunderstanding with the musicians: they offered to record him "for $1500 a side", which he took to mean $1500 per album side. When he found out that they meant $1500 per song, he left after recording three songs but resolved to work with them in the future. Back in '72 featured the studio version of Seger's later live classic "Turn the Page"; "Rosalie", a song Seger wrote about CKLW music director Rosalie Trombley (and which was later recorded by Thin Lizzy); and "I've Been Working", a song originally by Van Morrison, a strong influence on Seger's musical development. Despite the strength of Seger's backup musicians, the album only reached 188 on the US charts and has since faded into obscurity. Even so, Back in '72 and its supporting tour mark the beginnings of Seger's long-time relationships with future Silver Bullet Band saxophonist Alto Reed, powerhouse female vocalist Shaun Murphy, and the Muscle Shoals Rhythm Section. Over the tour, My Band would prove to be unreliable, which frustrated Seger. By the end of 1973, Seger had left My Band in search of a new backing band. Throughout 1974–75, Seger continued to perform in local venues around his hometown while known as the Bob Seger Group including one renowned concert in Davisburg, MI called the 'Battle of the Bands'.

The Silver Bullet Band 

In 1974, Seger formed the Silver Bullet Band. Its original members were guitarist Drew Abbott, drummer and backing vocalist Charlie Allen Martin, keyboardist and backing vocalist Rick Manasa, bass guitarist Chris Campbell, and saxophonist and backing vocalist  Alto Reed. With this new band sitting in occasionally, Seger released the album Seven (1974), which contained the Detroit-area hard-rock hit "Get Out of Denver". This track was a modest success and charted at  nationally.

In 1975, Seger returned to Capitol Records and released the album Beautiful Loser, with help from the Silver Bullet Band (with new keyboardist Robyn Robbins replacing Manasa) on his cover of the Tina Turner penned "Nutbush City Limits". The album's single "Katmandu" which was featured in the 1985 movie Mask starring Cher (in addition to being another substantial Detroit-area hit) was Seger's first real national break-out track since 1968's "Ramblin' Gamblin' Man". Although it just missed the US Pop Top 40 – peaking at  – the song received strong airplay in several markets nationwide including Detroit.

In April 1976, Seger and the Silver Bullet Band released the album Live Bullet, recorded over two nights in Detroit's Cobo Arena in September 1975. It contained Seger's rendition of "Nutbush City Limits" as well as Seger's classic take on life on the road, "Turn the Page", from Back in '72. It also included his late 1960s successful releases – "Heavy Music" and "Ramblin' Gamblin' Man". Critic Dave Marsh later wrote that "Live Bullet is one of the best live albums ever made ... In spots, particularly during the medley of "Travelin' Man"/"Beautiful Loser" on side one, Seger sounds like a man with one last shot at the top." An instant best-seller in Detroit, Live Bullet began to get attention in other parts of the country, selling better than Seger's previous albums, getting progressive rock radio and album-oriented rock airplay, and enabling Seger to headline more shows. Yet still, Seger had a popularity imbalance. In June 1976, he was a featured performer at the Pontiac Silverdome outside Detroit in front of nearly 80,000 fans. The next night, Seger played before fewer than a thousand people in Chicago.

Peak of success: 1976–1987 

Seger finally achieved his commercial breakthrough with his October 1976 album Night Moves. The title track, "Night Moves" was critically and commercially well-received, becoming a  hit on the Billboard Pop Singles chart and receiving airplay on AOR radio. Night Moves was Seger's first top-ten album in the Billboard album chart, and as of 2006 was certified at 6 million copies in the United States, making it the biggest-selling studio album of his entire career. The success of Night Moves also bolstered sales of Seger's previous releases. Seger's 1975 release Beautiful Loser would eventually sell two million copies and the 1976 album Live Bullet would go on to sell six million copies in the United States. Live Bullet would eventually be cited as one of the greatest live albums of all time.

In February 1977, Silver Bullet Band drummer Charlie Allen Martin was hit by a car from behind while walking on a service road and was left unable to walk. David Teegarden, previous drummer for Seger on his 1972 album Smokin' O.P.'s was his replacement. Despite the loss of Martin, Seger's 1978 album Stranger in Town was also a success. The first single, "Still the Same", reached  on the Billboard Hot 100. "Hollywood Nights" reached  on the same chart, while the ballad "We've Got Tonight" reached . "We've Got Tonight" was a major hit again when it was covered in 1983 by country music superstar Kenny Rogers and pop singer Sheena Easton. It has since been ranked the second-most played Jukebox Single of all time, behind Patsy Cline's "Crazy". "Old Time Rock and Roll" was named one of the Songs of the Century in 2001. Seger has since remarked that not taking one-third writing credit on his recording was, financially,  "the dumbest thing I ever did".

Seger also co-wrote the Eagles'  hit song "Heartache Tonight" from their 1979 album The Long Run; their collaboration about Seger's and Glenn Frey's shared early lives in Detroit.

In 1980, Seger released Against the Wind (with ex-Grand Funk Railroad member Craig Frost replacing Robyn Robbins on keyboards) and it became his first and only  album on the Billboard album chart. The first single "Fire Lake" featured Eagles Don Henley, Timothy B. Schmit, and Glenn Frey on backing vocals and Muscle Shoals guitarist, Pete Carr, on 12-string acoustic.  Fire Lake reached  on the Hot 100, while the title song "Against the Wind" reached  as a single and even crossed over to the Top 10 on Billboards Adult Contemporary chart. "You'll Accomp'ny Me" became the third hit single from the record, reaching . Against the Wind would also win two Grammy Awards. As of 2006, both Stranger in Town and Against the Wind had sold over 5 million copies each in the United States.

The live 1981 album Nine Tonight encapsulated this three-album peak of Seger's commercial career. Seger's take on Eugene Williams' "Tryin' to Live My Life Without You" became a Top Five hit from Nine Tonight and the album would go on to sell 4 million copies.

Seger released the acclaimed The Distance in December 1982. During the recording of this album, Silver Bullet guitarist Drew Abbott left the band due to his frustration with Seger's frequent use of session musicians in the studio and was replaced by Dawayne Bailey. After the album's release, David Teegarden also left the band due to internal conflict and was replaced by ex-Grand Funk drummer Don Brewer. Critically praised for representing a more versatile sound than that of his recent material, The Distance spawned numerous hits beginning with Rodney Crowell's "Shame on the Moon". The driving album track "Making Thunderbirds" was a popular music video filmed in Detroit and well-received on MTV. The Distance was belatedly released on 8-track tape; Capitol reportedly had no plans to do so, but Seger, claiming that many of his fans still used 8-track players in their vehicles, requested that the label also release the album in the waning format.

In 1984, Seger wrote and recorded the power rock ballad "Understanding" for the film soundtrack Teachers. The song was another Top 20 hit for Seger in late 1984. In 1986, he wrote and recorded "Living Inside My Heart" for the film soundtrack of About Last Night....

Seger was no longer as prolific, and several years elapsed before his next studio album, Like a Rock, emerged in the spring of 1986. The fast-paced "American Storm" was another Top-20 single aided by a popular music video featuring actress Lesley Ann Warren, and "Like a Rock" followed, reaching  on Billboard's Hot 100. Later, it would become familiar to many Americans through its association with a long-running Chevrolet ad campaign (something Seger explicitly chose to do to support struggling American automobile workers in Detroit). Seger's 1986–1987 American Storm Tour was his self-stated last major tour, playing 105 shows over nine months and selling almost 1.5 million tickets. Like a Rock reached  and eventually sold over three million copies, although it has never been certified above platinum.

On March 13, 1987, Bob Seger & the Silver Bullet Band received a star on the Hollywood Walk of Fame for their contributions to the music industry, located at 1750 Vine Street.

In 1987, Seger recorded the song "Shakedown" for the soundtrack to the film Beverly Hills Cop II. A synth-driven pop-rock song, it was Seger's first and only  hit on the pop singles chart. The song had originally been intended for fellow Detroiter Glenn Frey, but when Frey lost his voice just before the recording session, he asked Seger to take his place. Seger changed the verses of the song but kept the chorus the same. The song earned Seger an Academy Award nomination as co-writer in the Best Original Song category the following year.

Later years: 1988–present 
Bob Seger's next record was 1991's The Fire Inside, at a time when glam metal, grunge and alternative rock were taking the forefront. His new music found little visibility on the radio or elsewhere. The same was true of 1995's It's a Mystery, although the album was certified gold (500,000 copies sold). However, in 1994, Seger released Greatest Hits; the compilation album was his biggest-ever record in terms of sales, selling nearly 10 million copies in the United States . Seger did go back on the road again for a 1996 tour, which was successful and sold the fourth-largest number of tickets of any North American tour that year. (Seger was once known for his concerts in small venues, as witnessed with his appearance at the 18th Amendment in Omaha, Nebraska.)

Seger took a sabbatical from the music business for about ten years to spend time with his wife and two young children. In 2001 and 2002, Seger won the prestigious Port Huron to Mackinac Boat Race aboard his  sailboat Lightning. He subsequently sold the boat. He was inducted into the Rock and Roll Hall of Fame on March 15, 2004. Fellow Detroiter Kid Rock gave the induction speech and Michigan Governor Jennifer Granholm proclaimed that date Bob Seger Day in his honor. In 2005, Seger was featured singing with 3 Doors Down on the song "Landing in London" from their Seventeen Days album.

Bob Seger & The Silver Bullet Band were inducted into the Michigan Rock and Roll Legends Hall of Fame in 2005.

Seger's first new album in eleven years, titled Face the Promise, was released in 2006. In its first 45 days, it sold more than 400,000 copies. The album sold over 1.2 million copies, returning Seger to platinum status and staying on the Billboard chart for several months. His supporting tour was also eagerly anticipated, with many shows selling out within minutes. Showing that Seger's legendary appeal in Michigan had not diminished, all 10,834 tickets available for his first show at Grand Rapids' Van Andel Arena sold out in under five minutes; three additional shows were subsequently added, each of which also sold out.

In 2009, Seger released a compilation album titled Early Seger Vol. 1, which contained archival material from the 1970s and 1980s, including some fully or partially re-recorded tracks from his albums Smokin' O.P.'s (1972) and Seven (1974) and some never-before-released songs. The album was initially only available for purchase at Meijer stores and then later for download at BobSeger.com. Seger contributed piano and vocals on Kid Rock's 2010 album Born Free.  Seger staged a successful arena tour during 2011, accompanied by the release of a two-CD compilation album, Ultimate Hits: Rock and Roll Never Forgets.
On May 28, 2011, Michigan Governor Rick Snyder proclaimed that date as Bob Seger Day for his more than 50 years of sharing his celebrated musical talents with fans all over the world.

On December 30, 2011, before a sell-out crowd at the Mandalay Bay Events Center in Las Vegas, Seger closed another successful tour. On October 30, 2011, he told AnnArbor.com director, Bob Needham, he was returning to the studio to complete another new album for release in the fall of 2012, followed by another supporting tour.

On June 14, 2012, Seger was inducted into the Songwriters Hall of Fame. On January 10, 2013, Seger announced another tour in the US and Canada.

Seger performed a duet of "Who'll Stop the Rain" with John Fogerty on Fogerty's album Wrote a Song for Everyone, released in 2013.

Seger's 17th studio album, Ride Out was released on October 14, 2014. Ride Out was accompanied by a highly successful arena tour of the United States and Canada.

On December 22, 2016, Seger performed "Heartache Tonight" as the Kennedy Center honored the Eagles. A few weeks later, on January 18, 2017, Seger gave away the single "Glenn Song" on his website as a tribute marking the one-year death of Eagles founding member Glenn Frey, with whom Seger was close friends. Starting on August 24, 2017, Seger embarked on a 32-city Runaway Train tour that was originally scheduled to conclude on November 17, 2017, in Chicago. This tour included a show on September 22, 2017, at The Palace of Auburn Hills (Michigan), which was the last event to be held at that venue. The same day, Seger announced his new studio album, I Knew You When, and released "Busload of Faith", a cover of the Lou Reed song from the 1989 album New York, as the first single taken from the album. I Knew You When was released on November 17, 2017, which would have marked the last day of Seger's Runaway Train tour. However, due to "an urgent medical issue with his vertebrae", all concert dates starting September 30 had to be postponed. Of the 32 scheduled tour dates, Seger could complete 13 and had to postpone 19.

On September 18, 2018, Seger announced his final tour. Named the Travelin' Man tour, it includes postponed dates from the 2017 tour as well as additional shows, and was scheduled to kick off on November 21 at the Van Andel Arena in Grand Rapids, MI.

Legacy 
Lincoln Park declared November 17, 2017, "Bob Seger Day" in the city. Mayor Thomas Karnes called Seger the voice of the city for their generation. Seger attended school there in his youth and performed at the city's bandshell in the 1960s. In 2023, Rolling Stone ranked Seger at number 181 on its list of the 200 Greatest Singers of All Time.

Musical style and influences 
Bob Seger's musical style encompasses blues rock,  folk, garage rock, hard rock, heartland rock, heavy rock, psychedelic rock, rock and roll and soul.

Personal life 
Seger's first marriage to Renee Andrietti in 1968 lasted for "one day short of a year". He had a long-term relationship with Jan Dinsdale from 1972 until 1983. In 1987, he married actress Annette Sinclair and they divorced one year later. He married Juanita Dorricott in 1993, in a small private setting at The Village Club, in Bloomfield Hills; they have two children.

Politics
Politically, Seger has characterized himself as a centrist: "[I'm] right down the middle", he remarked. He supported Democrat Hillary Clinton in the 2016 presidential election. He tackled antiestablishment themes in early songs such as "2+2=?" (1968) and "U.M.C. (Upper Middle Class)" (1974), according to Brian McCollum of the Detroit Free Press. On his 2014 album Ride Out, he addressed topics such as gun violence, and wrote "It's Your World" about climate change. On the subject, he said, "There are a lot of culprits in climate change, and everybody's responsible, myself included. Nobody gets a free pass on this one. We've got to change our ways and change them fast."

He has considered President Barack Obama to be the favorite president of his lifetime; he met him at the 2016 Kennedy Center Honors and thanked Obama for his "wisdom and dignity".

Discography

Studio albums

 Ramblin' Gamblin' Man (1969)
 Noah (1969)
 Mongrel (1970)
 Brand New Morning (1971)
 Smokin' O.P.'s (1972)
 Back in '72 (1973)
 Seven (1974)
 Beautiful Loser (1975)
 Night Moves (1976)
 Stranger in Town (1978)
 Against the Wind (1980)
 The Distance (1982)
 Like a Rock (1986)
 The Fire Inside (1991)
 It's a Mystery (1995)
 Face the Promise (2006)
 Ride Out (2014)
 I Knew You When (2017)

Live albums
 Live Bullet (1976)
 Nine Tonight (1981)
Compilation albums
 Greatest Hits (1994)
 Greatest Hits 2 (2003)
 Early Seger Vol. 1 (2009)
 Ultimate Hits: Rock and Roll Never Forgets (2011)
 Heavy Music: The Complete Cameo Recordings 1966-1967 (2017)

See also 
 List of people from Ann Arbor

References 

Other sources
 1983 Rolling Stone Record Guide
 Joel Whitburn, The Billboard Book of Top 40 Hits, 1983. .
 Joel Whitburn, Top Adult Contemporary 1961–2001, 2002. .
 Stephen Thomas Erlewine, [ AllMusic biographical entry on Bob Seger]

External links 

 
 
 Bob Seger biography by Stephen Thomas Erlewine, discography and album reviews, credits & releases at AllMusic.com
 Bob Seger discography, album releases & credits at Discogs.com
 Bob Seger albums at Spotify.com

1945 births
Living people
American male singers
American rock musicians
American rock singers
American rock guitarists
American male guitarists
American rock pianists
American male pianists
American rock songwriters
Musicians from Ann Arbor, Michigan
Bob Seger & the Silver Bullet Band members
Michigan Democrats
People from Dearborn, Michigan
Grammy Award winners
Capitol Records artists
Rock and roll musicians
Songwriters from Michigan
Singers from Detroit
Guitarists from Detroit
People from Orchard Lake, Michigan
20th-century American guitarists
20th-century American pianists
21st-century American pianists
20th-century American male musicians
21st-century American male musicians
American male songwriters